Air Marshal Malcolm Shirley Dundas Wollen (2 August 1928 – 23 May 2013), PVSM, VrC, was an alumnus of Bishop Cotton Boys' School. He was commissioned into the Indian Air Force in 1947.

He was awarded the Sword of Honour, the Flying Trophy, and the President's Plaque.

Later, he was bestowed with the Vir Chakra and the Param Vishisht Seva Medal (PVSM).

After that, he served as Chairman, Hindustan Aeronautics Limited between 1984 and 1988. He was also the former president of the Aeronautical Society of India.

He died on 23 May 2013, in Bangalore.

References
 bharat-rakshak.com - Air Marshal Malcolm Shirley Dundas Wollen

1928 births
Indian Air Force air marshals
Bishop Cotton Boys' School alumni
Recipients of the Param Vishisht Seva Medal
2013 deaths
Recipients of the Vir Chakra
Indian Air Force officers
National Defence College, India alumni